The 1987 CFL Draft composed of eight rounds where 72 Canadian football players were chosen from eligible Canadian universities and Canadian players playing in the NCAA.

1st round

2nd round

3rd round

4th round

28. Ottawa Rough Riders                        Rae Robiritis             OC              British Columbia

29. Montreal Alouettes  David Stroud  DB  Minot State

30. Saskatchewan Roughriders               Oral Sybblis  OL  Acadia

31. Toronto Argonauts                          Scott Lesperance  OL  Colgate

32. Calgary Stampeders                         Bruno Geremia             DB              Calgary

33. Winnipeg Blue Bombers                      Rob Pavan                 LB              Guelph

34. British Columbia Lions  Andrew Murray  WR  Carleton

35. Edmonton Eskimos                           Jeff Funtasz  TB  Alberta

36. British Columbia Lions                     Robin Belanger  DB  McGill

5th round

37. Ottawa Rough Riders                        Brent Lewis               LB            Western Ontario

38. Montreal Alouettes                         Andre Schad               LB            Carleton

39. Saskatchewan Roughriders                   Bruce Lowe                NT            Wilfrid Laurier

40. Toronto Argonauts                          Veron Stiliadis           DL/LB         Wilfrid Laurier

41. Calgary Stampeders                         Paul Kerber               OL            Calgary

42. Winnipeg Blue Bombers                      Gus Alevizos              OL            Guelph

43. British Columbia Lions                     Ray Ljubistic  OL  Hawai'i-Manoa

44. Edmonton Eskimos                           Tim Spirel                TE           Western Ontario

45. Hamilton Tiger-Cats  Bill McIntyre             WR           St. Francis Xavier

6th round

46. Ottawa Rough Riders                        Gary Lehmberg             DL            Simon Fraser

47. Montreal Alouettes                         Joe Barnabe               WR            Carleton

48. Saskatchewan Roughriders                   Joe Marchildon  LB  York

49. Toronto Argonauts  Ron Klein                 DB            Wilfrid Laurier

50. Calgary Stampeders                         Tony Pierson              WR            Alberta

51. Winnipeg Blue Bombers  John Sutton  RB/FB  McMaster

52. British Columbia Lions                     Roald Kovacik             LB            British Columbia

53. Edmonton Eskimos                           Darrell Skuse             TB            Guelph

54. Hamilton Tiger-Cats                        Joe Fortune               OL            McMaster

7th round

55. Ottawa Rough Riders                        Rick Wolkensperg          WR            Western Ontario

56. Montreal Alouettes                         Mike Bertone              OL            Concordia

57. Saskatchewan Roughriders                   Kevin Stroud              OL            Minot State

58. Toronto Argonauts                          Rob Raycroft              OL            Toronto

59. Calgary Stampeders                         Craig Robson  OL  North Dakota

60. Winnipeg Blue Bombers                      Allan Lekun               OC            McGill

61. British Columbia Lions                     Rob Moretto               DB            British Columbia

62. Edmonton Eskimos                           Tony Spoletini            TB            Calgary

63. Hamilton Tiger-Cats                        Sean Guy                  DL            Purdue

8th round

64. Ottawa Rough Riders                        David Waterhouse  TB  Ottawa

65. Montreal Alouettes                         Jordan Leith  DB  British Columbia

66. Saskatchewan Roughriders                   Byron McCorkell  DT  Saskatchewan

67. Toronto Argonauts                          Dave Kohler  LB  Wilfrid Laurier

68. Calgary Stampeders                         Kent Lapa  DL  Murray State

69. Winnipeg Blue Bombers  Pete Riley  QB  Livingston

70. British Columbia Lions  Mike Murphy  DB  Central Washington

71. Edmonton Eskimos                           Ken Hoppus  OL  Whitworth

72. Hamilton Tiger-Cats                        Greg Doren  OL  Nevada-Reno

References
Canadian Draft

Canadian College Draft
Cfl Draft, 1987